Paramashivaloka was a title given posthumously to:

 Yasovarman, king of Angkor (889–910)
 Jayavarman V, Emperor of Angkor (968–1001)